is a Japanese baseball player. He has been with the Fukuoka SoftBank Hawks since 2009, and plays as pitcher, wearing number 50. In 2009, he was voted Most Valuable Rookie. The next year, he became the first pitcher ever to make 70 or more appearances in his first two seasons in the league.

He won the 2012 Sawamura Award with a record of 17-5 and a 1.91 ERA, with 153 strikeouts in  innings, and 3 complete games with 2 shutouts.

Settsu is a 5 ft 11 in, 200 lb right-handed pitcher. With an overhand delivery he throws a fastball that usually sits in 86-88 mph (tops out at 92 mph), curveball, slider, and a solid-average screwball around 80 mph. He also has decent command, posting a walks per nine innings rate of 2.38 in his career (until 2012 season).

References

External links
 Official profile on Hawks website 

1982 births
2013 World Baseball Classic players
Fukuoka SoftBank Hawks players
Japanese baseball players
Living people
Nippon Professional Baseball pitchers
Nippon Professional Baseball Rookie of the Year Award winners
Baseball people from Akita Prefecture
People from Akita (city)